The forest sharp-tailed snake (Contia longicaudae) is a species of snake in the family Colubridae. The species is endemic to the western coast of the United States.

Geographic range
C. longicaudae is found in northern California and southern Oregon.

Distribution and habitat
The forest sharp-tailed snake is not as widespread as its relative Contia tenuis (the sharp-tailed snake). The forest sharp-tailed snake is found in shaded wet forests along the western coast of the United States. The forest sharp tailed snake went unnoticed for a long time due to its vast similarities to Contia tenuis and because of the secretive nature of both species of sharp-tailed snakes, and also of their seasonally limited amount of activity.

Identification
The easiest way to set the two species apart is by looking at the tail length and the subcaudal scales. The forest sharp-tailed snake has a longer tail than Contia tenuis and more subcaudal scales. Specifically, the forest sharp-tailed snake has 43 to 58 subcaudal scales, whereas Contia tenuis has 24 to 42.

References

External links
"Contia logicaudae ". ITIS (Integrated Taxonomic Information System). https://www.itis.gov/servlet/SingleRpt/SingleRpt?search_topic=TSN&search_value=1082669#null.

Contia
Reptiles described in 2010
Reptiles of the United States
Endemic fauna of the United States